The Ugljevik Power Plant is a coal-fired power plant in Ugljevik, Bosnia and Herzegovina.  It is owned and operated by Rudnik i termoelektrana Ugljevik, a subsidiary of Elektroprivreda Republike Srpske. RiTE Ugljevik is an integrated coal mining and power generating company.

History
Ugljevik has been coal mining area since 1899. Construction of the coal-fired power plant started in 1976 and the first and only unit was commissioned in 1985.  At the same time, the old Ugljevik coal mine was closed, the new Bogutovo Selo mine was opened, and the integrated coal-mining and power generating company RiTE Ugljevik was created on the base of Rudnik Ugljevik mining company.

Construction of the second unit started in 1985 and halted during the Bosnian War.  During the war, the power plant was closed from April 1992 to November 1995, though the facilities and equipment were saved in expectation of resuming production.

In 2010, the power plant went through extensive upgrading, the power plant nevertheless remaining a major source of pollution for the whole Northwest Bosnia and beyond.

Description

The Ugljevik Power Plant is now one of the largest generators of electricity in Republika Srpska.  It has a combined heat and power generation unit with an installed capacity of 300 MW.  In 2009, it generated 1,559 GWh of electricity and consumed 1.3 million tonnes of coal.

Before the Bosnian War on the top of chimney with big white letters  was written 'TITO', in memory of communist leader of former Yugoslavia Josip Broz Tito. During the war text was rewritten, so now is visible a Serbian symbol, the Serbian cross.

The company plans to open a new coal mine, Ugljevik-Istok.  Some investors have showed interest in building a second unit with capacity of 600 MW of electricity.

The power plant is also infamously known as a one-of-a-kind polluter: it emits large amounts of dangerous sulphur dioxide compared to its relatively limited power generation capacity, and, as of April 2019, there was still no operational flue gas desulfurization unit. For this reason, the Uglevik power plant is also sometimes seen as a "Chernobyl of Europe".

See also 

 List of tallest structures in the world
 List of tallest buildings and structures in the world by country

References

External links 

 Official Website
 Another website of RiTE Ugljevik
 Official website of Ugljevik Municipality
 Ugljevik Info page
 http://www.skyscraperpage.com/cities/?buildingID=54040

Buildings and structures in Republika Srpska
Energy infrastructure completed in 1985
Towers completed in 1985
Coal-fired power stations in Bosnia and Herzegovina
Electric power companies of Bosnia and Herzegovina
Economy of Republika Srpska
Chimneys in Bosnia and Herzegovina
Ugljevik